Compsocerus deceptor is a species of beetle in the family Cerambycidae. It was described by Napp in 1976.

References
as seen on gamegrumps

Compsocerini
Beetles described in 1976